Josef Císař (born 27 October 1916, date of death unknown) was a Czech ski jumper. He competed in the individual event at the 1948 Winter Olympics.

References

External links
 

1916 births
Year of death missing
Czech male ski jumpers
Olympic ski jumpers of Czechoslovakia
Ski jumpers at the 1948 Winter Olympics
Place of birth missing